Milliarium of Aiton is an ancient Roman milestone (milliarium) discovered  in the 1758 in Aiton commune, near Cluj-Napoca, Romania. Dating from 108 AD, shortly after the Roman conquest of Dacia, the milestone shows the construction of the road from Potaissa to Napoca, by demand of the Emperor Trajan. It indicates the distance of ten thousand feet (P.M.X.) to Potaissa. This is the first epigraphical attestation of the settlements of Potaissa and Napoca in Roman Dacia.

The complete inscription is: "Imp(erator)/ Caesar Nerva/ Traianus Aug(ustus)/ Germ(anicus) Dacicus/ pontif(ex) maxim(us)/ (sic) pot(estate) XII co(n)s(ul) V/ imp(erator) VI p(ater) p(atriae) fecit/ per coh(ortem) I Fl(aviam) Vlp(iam)/ Hisp(anam) mil(liariam) c(ivium) R(omanorum) eq(uitatam)/ a Potaissa Napo/cam / m(ilia) p(assuum) X". It was recorded in the Corpus Inscriptionum Latinarum, vol. III, the 1627, Berlin, 1863.

This milliarium is an attestation of the road known to be built by Cohors I Hispanorum miliaria.

A copy of this milliarium was erected in June 1993 in front of the Turda Post Office (1 Dec. 1918 Street). Another copy exists in the front of the Aiton School.

Gallery

See also 
 Napoca
 Potaissa
 Roman roads
 History of Transylvania

Notes

References

Ancient

Modern

Further reading

External links 

Historic monuments in Cluj County
Roman Dacia
Monuments and memorials in Romania
Roman roads in Romania
Latin inscriptions in Romania
2nd-century inscriptions